Antonio Gutiérrez de Otero y Santayana (8 May 1729 – 15 May 1799) was a Spanish Lieutenant general best known for repelling Admiral Nelson's attack on Santa Cruz de Tenerife in 1797.

Biography 
He was born in Aranda de Duero, in Burgos, Old Castile, Spain. His father was in the military, and Gutiérrez followed his father's footsteps by enlisting as a cadet in the Spanish army at the age of seven.

He participated in Spanish military campaigns in Italy, the Falklands, Algiers, and in the 1779-1783 blockade of Gibraltar under General Martín Alvarez.  Gutiérrez also served as Commander of the island of Menorca.

He was named Commander-General of the Canary Islands in 1791, and assumed this position on 31 January 1791; his predecessor in the position had been the Marquis of Branciforte.

During the Battle of Santa Cruz de Tenerife (1797), Gutiérrez was suffering from an attack of asthma, but he managed to defeat British forces under Horatio Nelson.  Gutiérrez allowed the British to leave with their arms and war honors.

As a result of this victory, Gutiérrez was granted the Encomienda of Esparragal in the Order of Alcántara (a system of endowments) by Charles IV of Spain.

Gutiérrez's health continued to suffer and he was afflicted by an attack of paralysis on 22 April 1799.  He died on 15 May that year at Santa Cruz de Tenerife, and was buried in the chapel of Saint James the Great (Apóstol Santiago) in the parish of La Concepción de Santa Cruz de Santiago de Tenerife.

References

External links

 Biography of General Gutiérrez

Spanish generals
1729 births
1799 deaths
People from the Province of Burgos